Longjiazhai is a settlement in Yongshun County, Hunan province, China.

References

Yongshun County